The year 1771 in science and technology involved some significant events.

Astronomy
 Lagrange discusses how numerous astronomical observations should be combined so as to give the most probable result.

Chemistry
 British apothecary Thomas Henry invents a process for preparing magnesium oxide.

Exploration
 August 17 – Edinburgh botanist James Robertson makes the first recorded ascent of Ben Nevis in Scotland.

Mathematics
 Lagrange publishes his second paper on the general process for solving an algebraic equation of any degree via Lagrange resolvents; and proves Wilson's theorem that if n is a prime, then (n − 1)! + 1 is always a multiple of n.

Medicine
 Norfolk and Norwich Hospital founded in England.

Events
 March 15 – Society of Civil Engineers first meets (in London), the world's oldest engineering society.
 December 16 – French chemist Antoine Lavoisier (28) marries Marie-Anne Pierrette Paulze, not yet 14 and daughter of his senior in the Ferme générale.

Publications
 Louis Antoine de Bougainville publishes Le voyage autour du monde, par la frégate La Boudeuse, et la flûte L'Étoile.
 Peter Simon Pallas begins publication of Reise durch verschiedene Provinzen des Russischen Reichs, chronicling his ongoing scientific expedition through the Russian Empire.
 Arthur Young publishes The Farmer's Kalendar.

Awards
 Copley Medal: Matthew Raper

Births
 April 13 – Richard Trevithick (died 1833), Cornish mechanical engineer and inventor.
 August 22 – Henry Maudslay (died 1831), English mechanical engineer and inventor.
 September 11 – Mungo Park (died 1806), Scottish explorer.
 October 13 – Gotthelf Fischer von Waldheim (died 1853), Saxon-born naturalist.
 November 6 – Alois Senefelder (died 1834), Prague-born German inventor of lithography.
 December 14 – Regina von Siebold (died 1849), German physician and obstetrician.

Deaths
 February 20 – Jean-Jacques d'Ortous de Mairan, French geophysicist, astronomer and chronobiologist (born 1678)
 March 17 – Chester Moore Hall, English scientific instrument maker (born 1703)
 March 23 – Henry Hindley, English clock and scientific instrument maker (born c. 1701)
 December 6 – Giovanni Battista Morgagni, Italian anatomist (born 1682)
 December 15 – Benjamin Stillingfleet, English botanist (born 1702)

References

 
18th century in science
1770s in science